Ang TV was a youth-oriented comedy variety show in the Philippines. The show's format was inspired by its predecessor Kaluskos Musmos, (a popular Philippine kiddie gag show in the 1970s) and its foreign counterpart The Mickey Mouse Club. Prior to 1992, TV executive Freddie Garcia and ace TV director Johnny Manahan organized the ABS-CBN Talent Center and enlisted a group of kids and pre-teens to create the first ever youth-oriented comedy-variety show in the Philippines.  Its phenomenal success in 1993 had ABS-CBN develop provincial versions for Ang TV in Cebu, Bacolod and Davao.

Many of the Philippines' current artists are from Ang TV. Active Filipino artists from Ang TV include Jolina Magdangal, Roselle Nava, Jan Marini, Gio Alvarez, Angelica Panganiban, Claudine Barretto, Rica Peralejo, John Prats, Angelu de Leon, Camille Prats, Shaina Magdayao, Kaye Abad and Patrick Garcia.

Cast

First season (1992–1993)

Second season (1993–1995)

Third season (1995–1996)

Final season (1996-1997)

Special participation
 Winnie Cordero
 Joji Isla
 Giselle Sanchez
 Joy Viado
 Ian Oliver Nocum Tolentino
 Jobelle Camposano
 Paquito Diaz
 Romy Diaz
 Ruel Vernal

Ang TV (reformatted)
After running on-air for two years, Ang TV came back with a new theme song and a new logo, and the network added more talents to the show's list of bright stars.

Ang TV 2

After a couple more years the Ang TV "fever" continued, with many youngsters still auditioning to be a part of the show aired in 2001.

Legacy
Ang TV's famous catchphrase was "Nge!" after a joke, as well as it popularized the once iconic opening line "4:30 na! Ang TV na!".

Other ABS-CBN shows have picked up on this catchphrase as well (examples: The King of Comedy Dolphy, Bernardo Bernardo, Dang Cruz and Cita Astals from "Home Along Da Riles"; Joey Marquez, John Estrada, Amy Perez, Carmina Villarroel, Cynthia Patag, Gloria Romero and Richard Gomez, The Gwapings:Jomari Yllana, Mark Anthony Fernandez, and Eric Fructuoso, from "Palibhasa Lalake", Aga Muhlach, Jimmy Santos, Babalu, Ching Arellano and Agot Isidro, from "Oki Doki Doc"; Jim Paredes, Gel Santos-Relos and the staff of "Tatak Pilipino"; and Jennifer Sevilla, Noel Trinidad, Joji Isla, Roderick Paulate, Carmi Martin, Tessie Tomas, Nanette Inventor, Nova Villa and Sammy Lagmay from "Abangan ang Susunod na Kabanata"). Ang TV's theme was "Do Wah Diddy Diddy by Manfred Mann," which later was incorporated into the show's theme song.

A lot has changed during this era. Most of them are non showbiz personnel already. Some say that other Ang TV casts have started their career in the states. Some Ang TV talents were seen in a call center located in Ortigas and Libis. And some just enjoying their blessings while living a normal life. Yet then again these superstars changed the future of television making their show Legendary.

In homage to Ang TV, Bodie Cruz, as a cast member of the reality show Pinoy Big Brother (Season 2), had to complete a task of beginning each of his sentences with "Esmyuskee" (play with the phrase "excuse me"), and then ending them with "Nge!" Big Brother also featured some footage of Bodie's stint as an Ang TV kid.

Ang TV, The Album and Ang TV: Krismas Album was released in 1994 through Ivory Music & Video (formerly Ivory Records). Ang TV Na!: The Homecoming followed with a release date in 1996 via Star Records. Due to its popularity in 1996, the franchise released a movie, Ang TV Movie: The Adarna Adventure via Star Cinema, released on October 9.

Ang TV was re-aired again now on Jeepney TV in 2012 due to its popularity and loyalty of TV viewers.

More recently, the Esmyuskee skit appeared in ABS-CBN's 2013 summer station ID, with former Ang TV mainstay Angelica Panganiban and the Goin Bulilit kids reciting the skit.

The Esmyuskee skit was also used on Goin' Bulilit, with the Ang TV cast members Angelica Panganiban on September 22, 2013, and Jolina Magdangal on November 16, 2014, as special guests.

External links
 

ABS-CBN original programming
1990s comedy television series
2000s comedy television series
Philippine comedy television series
1992 Philippine television series debuts
1997 Philippine television series endings
2001 Philippine television series debuts
2001 Philippine television series endings
Filipino-language television shows
Star Cinema films
1996 films